DPAA may refer to:
 Data Path Acceleration Architecture (DPAA)
 Department of Defense POW/MIA Accounting Agency